The Arrondissement of Ypres is one of the eight administrative arrondissements in the Province of West Flanders, Belgium. It is both an administrative and a judicial arrondissement. However, the Judicial Arrondissement of Ypres also comprises the municipalities of Staden and Moorslede in the Arrondissement of Roeselare.

Municipalities
The Administrative Arrondissement of Ypres consists of the following municipalities:
Heuvelland
Langemark-Poelkapelle
Mesen
Poperinge
Vleteren
Wervik
Ypres
Zonnebeke

Ypres